Enteng Kabisote 2: Okay Ka Fairy Ko... The Legend Continues! is a 2005 fantasy film directed by Tony Y. Reyes. It is the second installment of the Enteng Kabisote film series and the fourth film installment based on Okay Ka, Fairy Ko!.

Synopsis
The magical world Engkantasya and Earth welcome a new addition to the Kabisote family: Ada, Enteng and Faye's new baby girl - a new princess of Engkantasya.

While both worlds were happy with this new addition, darkness is once again brooding both in Engkantasya and in Earth.

In the previous film, Satana (Bing Loyzaga), the ruler of Kadiliman (the dark world), lost her powers and was vanquished by Queen Magenta. Reborn through the blood of a traitor, Satana regained her powers and vowed to destroy Engkantasya. This time she has succeeded.

With the fall of Magenta's kingdom, Faye, her only daughter, was given the duty to find the 3 missing amulets that could rebuild Engkantasya. Enteng and his family are once again sucked into the magical world and have to travel through Satana's kingdom to save Engkantasya.

With the help of their new allies, Alyssa (Marian Rivera), Ada's godmother and daughter of Ina Azul (Toni Rose Gayda), Queen of Engkantasya's Azul Kingdom, and Verdana (Jose Manalo), the battered husband turned into Princess Fiona in ogre-mode lookalike, sent by Ina Verde (Melanie Marquez), Queen of Engkantasya's Verde Kingdom, Enteng and his family have to battle dragons, sea creatures, and sword-wielding dark minions to save the fate of Engkantasya.

Cast
Vic Sotto as Enteng Kabisote
Kristine Hermosa as Faye Kabisote
Alice Dixson as Ina Magenta
Aiza Seguerra as Aiza Kabisote 
Oyo Boy Sotto as Benok Kabisote
Bing Loyzaga as Satana / Ina Amarillo
Victor Neri as Drago
Bayani Casimiro II as Prinsipe K
Joey de Leon  as Pangay
Jose Manalo as Jose/ Verdana
Ruby Rodriguez as Amy
Toni Rose Gayda as Ina Azul
Melanie Marquez as Ina Verde
Angel Sy as Ada Kabisote
Marian Rivera as Alyssa

See also
 Okay Ka, Fairy Ko! (film series)

References

External links
 

Enteng Kabisote
2005 films
Philippine fantasy comedy films
2000s fantasy comedy films
M-Zet Productions films
OctoArts Films films
2005 comedy films
Films directed by Tony Y. Reyes